Nangal Khurd is a small village in the Hoshiarpur district of Punjab, India. Kalan is a Persian language word which means big and Khurd is a Persian word which means small; when two villages have the same name they are distinguished with the appropriate term together with the village's name. The total area of the village is 15 square kilometres and the population is around 1300. Nangal Khurd is situated 4 km from Mahilpur on Mahilpur-Phagwara Road (Via-Pasta).

The current Sarpanch is Mrs. Rajwinder Kaur. The village has one government school, one government dispensary and sangeet vidalya.

Most of the village's population is Bains Jatt caste. Sant Baba Harnam Singh Bains ji was born in this village and lived their childhood there. They divert to Saint after getting spiritual powers and did their meditation in village jeaan which is just 10 km from their own village Nangal Khurd (Mahilpur). After them in 1930 their follower built big Gurudwara Sahib at place of their hut in village jeaan. Village jeaan which is actually on Rajni Mata Road near Chabbewal. Most people of general cast lived in abroad.

Hoshiarpur
Villages in Hoshiarpur district